Minikowo may refer to the following places in Poland:
Minikowo, part of the Nowe Miasto district of Poznań
Minikowo, Nakło County
Minikowo, Tuchola County